Blasicrura is a genus of sea snails, marine gastropod mollusks in the family Cypraeidae, the cowries.

Species
Species within the genus Blasicrura include according to the World Register of Marine Species (WoRMS) 
Blasicrura interrupta (Gray, 1824)
Blasicrura pallidula (Gaskoin, 1849)
Blasicrura pallidula luchuana Kuroda, 1960
Blasicrura pallidula pallidula (Gaskoin, 1849-a)
Blasicrura summersi (Schilder, 1958)

The Indo-Pacific Molluscan Database also includes the following names in current use 
Blasicrura luchuana (Kuroda, 1960)
Blasicrura quadrimaculata (Gray, 1824): accepted by WoRMS as Eclogavena quadrimaculata (J.E. Gray, 1824)

Species brought into synonymy
Blasicrura alisonae Burgess, 1983: synonym of Blasicrura pellucens (Melvill, 1888)
Blasicrura coxeni (Cox, 1873): synonym of Eclogavena coxeni (Cox, 1873)
Blasicrura dani Beals, 2002: synonym of Eclogavena dani (Beals, 2002)
Blasicrura dayritiana (Cate, 1963): synonym of Eclogavena dayritiana (Cate, 1963)
Blasicrura goodalli (Sowerby I, 1832): synonym of Bistolida goodallii (Sowerby I, 1832)
Blasicrura hirundo (Linnaeus, 1758): synonym of Bistolida hirundo (Linnaeus, 1758)
Blasicrura kieneri (Hidalgo, 1906): synonym of Bistolida kieneri (Hidalgo, 1906)
Blasicrura latior (Melvill, 1888): synonym of Talostolida latior (Melvill, 1888)
Blasicrura owenii (Sowerby I, 1837): synonym of Bistolida owenii (Sowerby I, 1837)
Blasicrura pellucens (Melvill, 1888): synonym of Talostolida pellucens (Melvill, 1888)
Blasicrura rashleighana (Melvill, 1888): synonym of Ovatipsa rashleighana (Melvill, 1888)
Blasicrura stolida (Linnaeus, 1758) : synonym of Bistolida stolida (Linnaeus, 1758)
Blasicrura subteres (Weinkauff, 1881): synonym of Talostolida subteres (Weinkauff, 1881)
Blasicrura teres (Gmelin, 1791): synonym of Talostolida teres (Gmelin, 1791)

References

External links

Cypraeidae